One Man's Treasure is Mick Harvey's third solo album and the first not to feature the songs of Serge Gainsbourg. It includes two songs by Harvey, and several songs written by musicians Harvey had produced and/or performed with: "Come Into My Sleep" - Nick Cave; "Louise" - Tex, Don and Charlie; "Come On Spring" - Kim Salmon of Antenna; "Demon Alcohol" - Bambi Lee Savage; "Planetarium" - Bruno Adams of the band Once Upon A Time.

Track listing
"First St. Blues" (Lee Hazlewood) – 3:56
"Come Into My Sleep" (Nick Cave) – 3:46
"Louise" (Don Walker) – 4:34
"Come On Spring" (Dave Faulkner, Justin Frew, Stuart McCarthy, Kim Salmon) – 4:20
"Demon Alcohol" (Bambi Lee Savage) – 3:41
"Man Without a Home" (Mick Harvey) – 3:46
"Planetarium" (Bruno Adams, Chris Hughes, Chris Russell, Ollie Peters) – 4:02
"The River" (Tim Buckley) – 3:08
"Hank Williams Said It Best" (Guy Clark) – 4:03
"Bethelridge" (Robbie Fulks) – 4:35
"Mother of Earth" (Jeffrey Lee Pierce) – 3:33
"Will You Surrender?" (Mick Harvey) – 4:04

Personnel
Helen Mountfort - cello
Jason Bunn -  voila
Andrea Keeble, Robin Casinader, Suzanne Simpson - violin
Technical
David McCluney - mixing
Harry Howard - cover layout
Wendy Joy Morrissey - photography

References

Mick Harvey albums
2005 albums
Mute Records albums